First Missionary Baptist Church is a historic African-American Baptist church located at 819 Cypress Street in New Bern, Craven County, North Carolina.  It was built in 1906–1908, and is a rectangular brick church building in the Late Gothic Revival style.  It features a two-stage tower.

It was listed on the National Register of Historic Places in 1997.

References

Current Pastor Reverend Dr. Gregory l Holmes

African-American history of North Carolina
Baptist churches in North Carolina
Churches in New Bern, North Carolina
Churches on the National Register of Historic Places in North Carolina
Churches completed in 1908
20th-century Baptist churches in the United States
National Register of Historic Places in Craven County, North Carolina
1908 establishments in North Carolina